No Strings Attached is a 1990 compilation album of Meat Puppets songs released by their ex-record label SST Records. It was released after the band left SST Records to join London Records. The compilation includes songs from their first album Meat Puppets (1982) through to their 1989 album Monsters. The Meat Puppets had no involvement in this release.

Track listing
All songs written by Curt Kirkwood, unless otherwise noted.
  
"Big House" (Meat Puppets) - 1:04
"In a Car" (Meat Puppets) - 1:19
"Tumblin' Tumbleweeds" (Bob Nolan) - 2:02
"Reward" (Curt Kirkwood, Derrick Bostrom) - 1:08
"The Whistling Song" - 2:56
"New Gods" - 2:10
"Lost" - 3:25
"Lake of Fire" - 1:55
"Split Myself in Two" - 2:22
"Up on the Sun" - 4:01
"Swimming Ground" - 3:04
"Maiden's Milk" (Curt Kirkwood, Cris Kirkwood) - 3:16
"Bucket Head" - 2:20
"Out My Way" (Meat Puppets) - 4:49
"Confusion Fog" - 3:48
"I Am a Machine" - 4:21
"Quit It" - 2:35
"Beauty" - 2:59
"Look at the Rain" - 4:19
"I Can't Be Counted On" (Curt Kirkwood, Cris Kirkwood) - 3:58
"Automatic Mojo" (Curt Kirkwood, Cris Kirkwood) - 3:20
"Meltdown" - 3:06
"Like Being Alive" - 4:42
"Attacked by Monsters" - 4:41

Song origins
Tracks 1 and 2 are from the In a Car EP.
Tracks 3 and 4 are from Meat Puppets.
Tracks 5-9 are from Meat Puppets II.
Tracks 10-13 are from Up on the Sun.
Track 14 is from the Out My Way EP.
Tracks 15-18 are from Mirage.
Tracks 19-21 are from Huevos.
Tracks 22-24 are from Monsters.

References

External links
[ Allmusic No Strings Attached Overview]
1990 Entertainment Weekly Review

Meat Puppets albums
1990 compilation albums
SST Records compilation albums